The North Korea national ice hockey team is the national men's ice hockey team of the Democratic People's Republic of Korea (North Korea), and represent the country in IIHF competition. They withdrew from the 2007 World Championships, and therefore were automatically relegated to Division III in the 2008 edition, where they finished first. They then played in Division II during the 2009 edition, and finished last bringing them back down to Division III for 2010. They are currently ranked 45th in the IIHF World Rankings.

History
The game of ice hockey in North Korea became popular during the 1950s when Soviet and Chinese workers taught the game and its rules in the capital city of Pyongyang. The Ice Hockey Association of the DPR Korea was founded in 1955. North Korea became a member of the IIHF on 8 August 1964. North Korea's first national championship was held in 1956 and was won by Amnokgang Pyongyang. The North Korea national team did not make its debut until 1974, when it competed in the C pool of the World Championships. The team lost its first game to Italy 11–2 on 8 March 1974, but rebounded for a surprising victory over China.

Withdrawal from 2011, 2022 and 2023 IIHF tournaments
DPR Korea announced that their men's and women's teams were not going to compete in IIHF competition due to financial reasons. The men's team was scheduled to participate at the Div II championships in Melbourne, Australia, while the women's team was scheduled to participate at the Div II championship in Caen, France. DPR Korea men's team also withdrew from Division III A tournaments in 2022 and 2023 due to the COVID-19 pandemic, and therefore has not been active since 2019.

Tournament participation

World Championships
1974 – 22nd place (8th in Pool C)
1981 – 23rd place (7th in Pool C)
1983 – 24th place (8th in Pool C)
1985 – 23rd place (7th in Pool C)
1986 – 23rd place (7th in Pool C)
1987 – 22nd place (6th in Pool C)
1989 – 22nd place (6th in Pool C)
1990 – 21st place (5th in Pool C)
1991 – 23rd place (7th in Pool C)
1992 – 22nd place (2nd in Pool C, Group A)
1993 – 26th place (6th in Pool C)
2002 – 41st place (1st in Division II qualification)
2003 – 35th place (4th in Division II, Group B)
2004 – 34th place (3rd in Division II, Group B)
2005 – 34th place (3rd in Division II, Group B)
2006 – 36th place (4th in Division II, Group B)
2007 – Withdrew from tournament, relegated to Division III
2008 – 41st place (1st in Division III) Promoted to Division II
2009 – 39th place (6th in Division II, Group A) Relegated to Division III
2010 – 42nd place (1st in Division III, Group B) Promoted to Division II
2011 – Withdrew from Division II
2012 – 42nd place (2nd in Division III)
2013 – 42nd place (2nd in Division III)
2014 – 42nd place (2nd in Division III)
2015 – 41st place (1st in Division III) Promoted to Division II B
2016 – 39th place (5th in Division II B)
2017 – 38th place (4th in Division II B)
2018 – 38th place (4th in Division II B)
2019 – 40th place (6th in Division II, Group B) Relegated to Division III A
2020 – Cancelled due to the COVID-19 pandemic
2021 – All lower division tournaments cancelled due to the COVID-19 pandemic
2022 – Withdrew from Division III A due to the COVID-19 pandemic
2023 – Withdrew from Division III A due to the COVID-19 pandemic

Asian Winter Games
1986 – 4th place
1990 – 4th place
2007 – 5th place

References

External links
IIHF profile
National Teams of Ice Hockey

 
Ice hockey in North Korea
Korea, North